Kheyrabad (also Romanized as Kheyrābād and Khaīrābād) is a village in Moshkabad Rural District, in the Central District of Arak County, Markazi Province, Iran. At the 2006 census, its population was 2,312, in 662 families.

References 

Populated places in Arak County